The 2019 Baltimore Orioles season was the 119th season in Baltimore Orioles franchise history, 66th in Baltimore, and the 28th at Oriole Park at Camden Yards. The Orioles were managed by Brandon Hyde in his first season as Orioles manager. They finished 54–108, 7 games better than their disastrous 47–115 record from their 2018 season, but they missed the playoffs for a third straight season, as they were mathematically eliminated from playoff contention on August 23.

The season set several statistical records and quirks. The Orioles finished last in the AL East for a third consecutive season. The Orioles set a franchise record of a combined 101–223 over the previous two seasons, the worst two-season span in franchise history. The 2019 Orioles became the first team in history to yield 300+ home runs in a season, a new MLB record. The pitching staff also allowed 981 runs throughout the season - an abysmal mark that led all of MLB and was the worst in MLB history since the 1999 Colorado Rockies allowed 1028 runs. They were also the first team since the 1979 Blue Jays to lose 107 or more games and not earn the first overall pick in the subsequent year's draft, as the Detroit Tigers finished 47-114, 6 1/2 games worse than Baltimore.

Between July 17 and 27, the Orioles hit multiple home runs in each of 10 consecutive games, an MLB record since 1901.

Regular season

Season standings

American League East

American League Wild Card

Record vs. Opponents

Game log

|-style="background:#fbb;"
||1|| March 28 || @ Yankees || 2–7 || Tanaka (1–0) || Cashner (0–1) || — || 46,929 || 0–1 || L1
|-style=background:#bfb;"
||2|| March 30 || @ Yankees || 5–3 || Yacabonis (1–0) || Paxton (0–1) || Wright (1) || 42,203 || 1–1 || W1
|-style=background:#bfb;"
||3|| March 31 || @ Yankees || 7–5 || Means (1–0) || Happ (0–1) || Fry (1) || 38,419 || 2–1 || W2
|-style=background:#bfb;"
||4||  || @ Blue Jays || 6–5 || Hess (1–0) || Reid-Foley (0–1) || Bleier (1) || 10,460 || 3–1 || W3
|-style=background:#bfb;"
||5|| April 2 || @ Blue Jays || 2–1 || Cashner (1–1) || Stroman (0–1) || Castro (1) || 12,110 || 4–1 || W4
|-style=background:#fbb;"
||6|| April 3 || @ Blue Jays || 3–5 || Shoemaker (2–0)|| Karns (0–1) || Giles (2) || 11,436 || 4–2 || L1
|-style=background:#fbb;"
||7|| April 4 || Yankees || 4–8 || Paxton (1-1) || Wright (0-1) || — || 44,182 || 4–3 || L2
|-style=background:#fbb;"
||8|| April 6 || Yankees || 4–6 || Ottavino (1-0) || Castro (0-1) || Chapman (2) || 27,504 || 4–4 || L3
|-style=background:#fbb;"
||9|| April 7 || Yankees || 3–15 || Germán (2-0) || Hess (1-1) || — || 33,102 || 4–5 || L4
|-style=background:#bfb;"
||10|| April 8 || A's || 12–4 || Cashner (2-1) || Estrada (0-1) || — || 6,585 || 5–5 || W1
|-style=background:#fbb;"
||11|| April 9 || A's || 2–13 || Anderson (3-0) || Means (0-1) || — || 7,738 || 5–6 || L1
|-style=background:#fbb;"
||12||  || A's || 3–10 || Montas (2-1) || Straily (0-1) || — || 7,974 || 5–7 || L2
|-style=background:#fbb;"
||13|| April 11 || A's || 5–8 || Brooks (2-1) || Bundy (0-1) || Treinen (4) || 8,374 || 5–8 || L3
|-style=background:#fbb;"
||14|| April 12 || @ Red Sox || 4–6 || Rodríguez (1-2) || Hess (1-2) || Brasier (3) || 33,664 || 5–9 || L4
|-style=background:#bfb
||15|| April 13 || @ Red Sox || 9–5 || Cashner (3-1) || Porcello (0-3) || — || 35,823 || 6–9 || W1
|-style=background:#fbb;"
||16|| April 14 || @ Red Sox || 0–4 || Price (1-1) || Means (1-2) || — || 36,023 || 6–10 || L1
|-style=background:#bfb;"
||17|| April 15 || @ Red Sox || 8–1 || Straily (1-1) || Velázquez (0-1) || — || 35,860 || 7–10 || W1
|-style=background:#fbb;"
||18|| April 16 || @ Rays || 2–4 || Glasnow (4-0) || Bundy (0-2) || Castillo (2) || 9,842 || 7–11 || L1
|-style=background:#fbb;"
||19|| April 17 || @ Rays || 1–8 || Chirinos (3-0) || Hess (1-3) || — || 9,028 || 7–12 || L2
|-style=background:#bfb
||20|| April 18 || @ Rays || 6–5 (11) || Means (2-2) || Castillo (0-1) || — || 9,081 || 8–12 || W1
|-style=background:#fbb;"
||21|| April 20 || Twins || 5–6 || Berríos (3-1) || Yacabonis (1-1) || Rogers (2) || 28,409 || 8–13 || L1
|-style=background:#fbb;"
||22|| April 20 || Twins || 7–16 || Pérez (2-0) || Cobb (0-1) || — || 28,409 || 8–14 || L2
|-style=background:#fbb;"
||23|| April 21 || Twins || 3–4 || Gibson (1-0) || Bundy (0-3) || Rogers (3) || 11,018 || 8–15 || L3
|-style=background:#fbb;"
||24|| April 22 || White Sox || 2–12 || Fry (1-0) || Hess (1-4) || — || 8,555 || 8–16 || L4
|-style=background:#bfb
||25|| April 23 || White Sox || 9–1 || Cashner (4-1) || Nova (0-3) || — || 8,953 || 9–16 || W1
|-style=background:#bfb
||26|| April 24 || White Sox || 4–3 || Means (3-2) || Santana (0-2) || Givens (1) || 10,550 || 10–16 || W2
|-style=background:#fbb;"
||27|| April 26 || @ Twins || 1–6 || Pérez (3–0) || Cobb (0–2) || — || 23,658 || 10–17 || L1
|-style=background:#fbb;"
||28|| April 27 || @ Twins || 2–9 || Berríos (4–1) || Fry (0–1) || — || 18,878 || 10–18 || L2
|-style=background:#fbb;"
||29|| April 28 || @ Twins || 1–4 || Gibson (2–0) || Bundy (0–4) || Parker (5) || 20,034 || 10–19 || L3
|-style=background:#fbb;"
||30|| April 29 ||  || 3–5 || Bañuelos (2–0) || Means (3–3) || Colomé (6) || 14,717 || 10–20 || L4
|-style=background:#bbb;"
||--|| April 30 || @ White Sox || colspan=8|Postponed (rain); Makeup: May 1 
|-

|-style=background:#bfb
||31|| May 1 ||  || 5–4 || Kline (1–0) || Herrera (0–1) || Givens (2) || N/A || 11–20 || W1
|-style=background:#fbb
||32|| May 1 || @ White Sox || 6–7 || Vieira (1–0) || Phillips (0–1) || — || 14,781 || 11–21 || L1
|-style=background:#fbb
||33|| May 3 || Rays || 0–7 || Glasnow (6–0) || Straily (1–2) || — || 10,034 || 11–22 || L2
|-style=background:#bfb
||34|| May 4 || Rays || 3–0 || Bundy (1–4) || Chirinos (4–1) || Givens (3) || 15,241 || 12–22 || W1
|-style=background:#bbb
||--|| May 5 || Rays || colspan=8|Postponed (rain); Makeup: July 13 
|-style=background:#bfb
||35|| May 6 || Red Sox || 4–1 || Means (4-3) || Smith (0-1) || Givens (4) || 11,042 || 13–22 || W2
|-style=background:#fbb
||36|| May 7 || Red Sox || 5–8 || Walden (5–0) || Kline (1–1) || Barnes (3) || 10,703 || 13–23 || L1
|-style=background:#fbb
||37|| May 8 || Red Sox || 1–2 (12) || Brasier (2–1) || Ramírez (0–1) || Hembree (1) || 12,451 || 13–24 || L2
|-style=background:#fbb
||38||  || Angels || 3–8 || Cahill (2-3) || Straily (1-3) || — || 14,495 || 13–25 || L3
|-style=background:#fbb
||39|| May 11 || Angels || 2–7 || Bard (1-1) || Bundy (1-5) || — || 21,106 || 13–26 || L4
|-style=background:#bfb
||40|| May 12 || Angels || 5–1 || Means (5-3) || Canning (1-1) || — || 16,387 || 14–26 || W1
|-style=background:#bbb
||—|| May 13 || @ Yankees || colspan=8|Postponed (rain); Makeup: May 15
|-style=background:#bbb
||—|| May 14 || @ Yankees || colspan=8|Postponed (rain); Makeup: August 12
|-style=background:#fbb
||41|| May 15 || @ Yankees || 3–5 || Happ (3-3) || Hess (1-5) || Chapman (10) || 41,138 || 14–27 || L1
|-style=background:#fbb
||42|| May 15 || @ Yankees || 1–3 || Germán (8-1) || Cashner (4-2) || Chapman (11) || 41,138 || 14–28 || L2
|-style=background:#fbb
||43|| May 16 || @ Indians || 7–14 || Cole (1-1) || Ynoa (0-1) || — || 16,324 || 14–29 || L3
|-style=background:#bfb
||44|| May 17 || @ Indians || 5–1 || Bundy (2-5) ||  Rodríguez (1-3) || — || 22,999 || 15–29 || W1
|-style=background:#fbb
||45|| May 18 || @ Indians || 1–4 || Plutko (1-0) || Means (5-4) || Hand (12) || 25,562 || 15–30 || L1
|-style=background:#fbb
||46|| May 19 || @ Indians || 0–10 || Bieber (3-2) || Ramírez (0-2) || — || 21,377 || 15–31 || L2
|-style=background:#fbb
||47|| May 20 || Yankees || 7–10 || Britton (2-0) || Givens (0-1) || Chapman (12) || 16,457 || 15–32 || L3
|-style=background:#fbb
||48|| May 21 || Yankees || 4–11 || Germán (9-1) || Hess (1-6) || Hale (1) || 17,389 || 15–33 || L4
|-style=background:#fbb
||49|| May 22 || Yankees || 5–7 || Sabathia (3-1) || Straily (1-4) || Chapman (13) || 17,849 || 15–34 || L5
|-style=background:#fbb
||50|| May 23 || Yankees || 5–6 || Kahnle (2-0) || Givens (0-2) || Britton (2) || 30,624 || 15–35 || L6
|-style=background:#fbb
||51|| May 24 || @ Rockies || 6–8 || Oberg (2–0) || Givens (0–3) || — || 32,397 || 15–36 || L7
|-style=background:#bfb
||52|| May 25 || @ Rockies || 9–6 ||  || Freeland (2–6) || Lucas (1) || 41,239 || 16–36 || W1
|-style=background:#fbb
||53|| May 26 || @ Rockies || 7–8 || Oberg (3–0) || Fry (0–2) || — || 46,815 || 16–37 || L1
|-style=background:#bfb
||54|| May 27 || Tigers || 5–3 || Straily (2–4) || Norris (2–3) ||  Armstrong (1) || 18,004 || 17–37 || W1
|-style=background:#fbb
||55|| May 28 || Tigers || 0–3 || Boyd (5–4) || Bundy (2–6) || Greene (17) || 8,106 || 17–38 || L1
|-style=background:#fbb
||56|| May 29 || Tigers || 2–4 || Ramirez (1–0) || Kline (1–2) || Greene (18) || 10,614 || 17–39 || L2
|-style=background:#bfb
||57|| May 31 || Giants || 9–6 || Cashner (6–2) || Pomeranz (1–6) || Bleier (2) || 17,545 || 18–39 || W1
|-

|-style=background:#fbb
||58|| June 1 || Giants || 2–8 || Anderson (1–1) || Hess (1–7) || — || 19,352 || 18–40 || L1
|-style=background:#fbb
||59|| June 2 || Giants || 1–8 || Samardzija (3–4) || Ynoa (0–2) || — || 16,991 || 18–41 || L2
|-style=background:#bfb
||60|| June 4 ||  || 12–11 || Bundy (3–6) || Smyly (1–4) ||  Givens (5) || 21,903 || 19–41 || W1
|-style=background:#fbb
||61|| June 5 || @ Rangers || 1–2 (12) || Springs (3–1) || Fry (0–3) || — || 21,163 || 19–42 || L1
|-style=background:#fbb
||62|| June 6 || @ Rangers || 3–4 || Jurado (3–2) || Hess (1–8) || Kelley (7) || 20,462 || 19–43 || L2
|-style=background:#fbb
||63|| June 7 || @ Astros || 3–4 (11) || Pérez (1–0) || Kline (1–3) || — || 35,414 || 19–44 || L3
|-style=background:#bfb
||64|| June 8 || @ Astros || 4–1 || Fry (1–3) || Harris (1–1) || Castro (2) || 38,425 || 20–44 || W1
|-style=background:#fbb
||65|| June 9 || @ Astros || 0–4 || Miley (6–3) || Bundy (3–7) || Osuna (17) || 35,621 || 20–45 || L1
|-style=background:#bfb
||66|| June 11 || Blue Jays || 4–2 || Means (6–4) || Thornton (1–5) || Givens (6) || 12,524 || 21–45 || W1
|-style=background:#fbb
||67|| June 12 || Blue Jays || 6–8 || Jackson (1–4) || Hess (1–9) || Hudson (1) || 11,153 || 21–46 || L1
|-style=background:#fbb
||68|| June 13 || Blue Jays || 3–12 || Stroman (4–8) || Ynoa (0–3) || — || 14,910 || 21–47 || L2
|-style=background:#fbb
||69|| June 14 || Red Sox || 2–13 || Rodríguez (7–4) || Ortiz (0–1) || — || 19,383 || 21–48 || L3
|-style=background:#fbb
||70|| June 15 || Red Sox || 2–7 || Sale (3–7) || Bundy (3–8) || — || 30,050 || 21–49 || L4
|-style=background:#fbb
||71|| June 16 || Red Sox || 6–8 || Workman (5–1) || Givens (0–4)|| — || 27,964 || 21–50 || L5
|-style=background:#fbb
||72|| June 17 || @ A's || 2–3 || Fiers (7–3) || Cashner (6–3) || Treinen (16) || 12,345 || 21–51 || L6
|-style=background:#fbb
||73|| June 18 || @ A's || 2–16 || Anderson (7–4) || Ynoa (0–4) || — || 14,310 || 21–52 || L7
|-style=background:#fbb
||74|| June 19 || @ A's || 3–8 || Bassitt (4–3) || Rogers (0–1) || — || 15,341 || 21–53 || L8
|-style=background:#fbb
||75|| June 20 || @ Mariners || 2–5 || LeBlanc (4–2) || Bundy (3–9) || Elías (8) || 15,217 || 21–54 || L9
|-style=background:#fbb
||76|| June 21 || @ Mariners || 9–10 || Leake (7–6) || Gilmartin (0–1) || Elías (9) || 23,281 || 21–55 || L10
|-style=background:#bfb
||77|| June 22 || @ Mariners || 8–4 || Cashner (7–3) || Milone (1–2) || — || 27,545 || 22–55 || W1
|-style=background:#fbb
||78|| June 23 || @ Mariners || 3–13 || Kikuchi (4–5) || Ynoa (0–5) || — || 23,920 || 22–56 || L1
|-style=background:#fbb
||79|| June 25 || Padres || 3–8 || Allen (2–0) || Yacabonis (1–2) || — || 21,644 || 22–57 || L2
|-style=background:#fbb
||80|| June 26 || Padres || 5–10 || Strahm (3–6) || Bundy (3–10) || Stammen (4) || 13,408 || 22–58 || L3
|-style=background:#bfb
||81|| June 28 || Indians || 13–0 || Means (7–4) || Clevinger (1–2) || — || 21,248 || 23–58 || W1
|-style=background:#bfb
||82|| June 29 || Indians || 13–0 || Cashner (8–3) || Plesac (3–3) || — || 26,998 || 24–58 || W2
|-style=background:#fbb
||83|| June 30 || Indians || 0–2 || Bieber (7–3) || Ynoa (0–6) || Hand (23) || 20,048 || 24–59 || L1
|-

|-style=background:#fbb
||84|| July 1 || @ Rays || 3–6 || Kolarek (3–2) || Kline (1–4) || Alvarado (7) || 20,441 || 24–60 || L2
|-style=background:#fbb
||85|| July 2 || @ Rays || 3–6 || Morton (9–2) ||  || — || 20,925 || 24–61 || L3
|-style=background:#bfb
||86|| July 3 || @ Rays || 9–6 || Givens (1–4) || Alvarado (0–5) ||  || 21,545 || 25–61 || W1
|-style=background:#bfb
||87|| July 5 || @ Blue Jays || 4–1 || Bundy (4–10) || Sanchez (3–12) || Fry (3) || 20,530 || 26–61 || W2
|-style=background:#bfb
||88|| July 6 || @ Blue Jays || 8–1 || Cashner (9–3) || Richard (1–5) || — || 22,405 || 27–61 || W3
|-style=background:#fbb
||89|| July 7 || @ Blue Jays || 1–6 || Thornton (3–6) || Wojciechowski (0–2) || — || 22,487 || 27–62 || L1
|-style=background:#bbbfff
||--|| July 9 || colspan="9"|90th All-Star Game in Cleveland, OH
|-style=background:#fbb
||90||  || Rays || 4–16 || Chirinos (8–4) || Bundy (4–11) || — || 22,422 || 27–63 || L2
|-style=background:#bfb
||91|| July 13 || Rays || 2–1 || Bleier (1–0) || Poche (2–2) || Givens (7) || 22,596 || 28–63 || W1
|-style=background:#fbb
||92|| July 13 || Rays || 4–12 || Morton (11–2) || Means (7–5) || — || 24,810 || 28–64 || L1
|-style=background:#fbb
||93|| July 14 || Rays || 1–4 ||  || Eshelman (0–1) || Pagán (6) || 14,082 || 28–65 || L2
|-style=background:#fbb
||94|| July 16 || Nationals || 1–8 || Voth (1–0) || Wojciechowski (0–3) || — || 23,362 || 28–66 || L3
|-style=background:#bfb
||95|| July 17 || Nationals || 9–2 || Ynoa (1–6) || Suero (2–5) || Givens (8) || 20,786 || 29–66 || W1
|-style=background:#bfb
||96|| July 19 || Red Sox || 11–2 || Means (8–5) || Price (7–3) || — || 18,243 || 30–66 || W2
|-style=background:#fbb
||97|| July 20 || Red Sox || 6–17 || Porcello (8–7) || Eshelman (0–2) || — || 21,339 || 30–67 || L1
|-style=background:#bfb
||98|| July 21 || Red Sox || 5–0 ||  || Cashner (9–5) || — || 18,173 || 31–67 || W1
|-style=background:#fbb
||99|| July 22 ||  || 3–6 || Ray (9–6) || Brooks (2–4) || Holland (16) || 19,192 || 31–68 || L1
|-style=background:#bfb
||100|| July 23 || @ Diamondbacks || 7–2 || Bundy (5–11) || Kelly (7–10) || — || 20,253 || 32–68 || W1
|-style=background:#fbb
||101|| July 24 || @ Diamondbacks || 2–5 || Clarke (3–3) || Means (8–6) || López (1) || 20,452 || 32–69 || L1
|-style=background:#bfb
||102|| July 25 || @ Angels || 10–8 (16) || Scott (1–0)|| Canning (3–6) || Wilkerson (1) || 36,214 || 33–69 || W1
|-style=background:#bfb
||103|| July 26 || @ Angels || 9–3 || Wojciechowski (2–3) || Tropeano (0–1) || — || 38,852 || 34–69 || W2
|-style=background:#bfb
||104|| July 27 || @ Angels || 8–7 || Bleier (2–0) || Buttrey (6–5) || Givens (9) || 42,289 || 35–69 || W3
|-style=background:#fbb
||105|| July 28 || @ Angels || 4–5 || Cole (1–1)  || Givens (1–5) || — || 35,447 || 35–70 || L1
|-style=background:#fbb
||106|| July 29 || @ Padres || 1–8 || Paddack (7–5) || Hess (1–10) || — || 34,290 || 35–71 || L2
|-style=background:#bfb
||107|| July 30 || @ Padres || 8–5 || Castro (1–1) || Strahm (4–8) || Armstrong (3) || 30,286 || 36–71 || W1
|-

|-style=background:#fbb
||108|| August 1 || Blue Jays || 2–11 || Thornton (4–7) || Wojciechowski (2–4) || — || 9,716 || 36–72 || L1
|-style=background:#fbb
||109|| August 2 || Blue Jays || 2–5 || Kingham (4–2) || Brooks (2–5) || Law (1) || 16,331 || 36–73 || L2
|-style=background:#bfb
||110|| August 3 || Blue Jays || 6–4 || Givens (2–5) || Boshers (0–1) || Fry (3) || 12,951 || 37–73 || W1
|-style=background:#bfb
||111|| August 4 || Blue Jays || 6–5 || Eshelman (1–2) || Reid-Foley (1–2) || Armstrong (4) || 18,837 || 38–73 || W2
|-style=background:#fbb
||112|| August 5 || Yankees || 6–9 || Ottavino (5–3) || Fry (1–4) || Chapman (30) || 20,151 || 38–74 || L1
|-style=background:#fbb
||113|| August 6 || Yankees || 4–9 || Cortes Jr. (5–0) || Wojciechowski (2–5) || Ottavino (1) || 17,201 || 38–75 || L2
|-style=background:#fbb
||114|| August 7 || Yankees || 2–14 || Paxton (7–6) || Means (8–7) || — || 16,299 || 38–76 || L3
|-style=background:#fbb
||115|| August 9 || Astros || 2–3 || Miley (11–4) || Bundy (5–12) || Osuna (26) || 19,407 || 38–77 || L4
|-style=background:#fbb
||116|| August 10 || Astros || 2–23 || Sanchez (5–14) || Brooks (2–6) || — || 21,903 || 38–78 || L5
|-style=background:#bfb
||117|| August 11 || Astros || 8–7 || Bleier (3–0) || Osuna (3–3) || — || 17,979 || 39–78 || W1
|-style=background:#fbb
||118|| August 12 || @ Yankees || 5–8 || Paxton (8–6) || Ynoa (1–7) || Chapman (32) || 42,843 || 39–79 || L1
|-style=background:#fbb
||119|| August 12 || @ Yankees || 8–11 || Mantiply (1–0) || Blach (0–1) || Ottavino (2) || 40,354 || 39–80 || L2
|-style=background:#fbb
||120|| August 13 || @ Yankees || 3–8 || Germán (16–2) || Means (8–8) || — || 41,284 || 39–81 || L3
|-style=background:#fbb
||121|| August 14 || @ Yankees || 5–6 || Happ (10–7) || Bundy (5–13) || Chapman (33) || 43,909 || 39–82 || L4
|-style=background:#fbb
||122|| August 16 || @ Red Sox || 1–9 || Porcello (11–9) || Brooks (2–7) || — || 37,213 || 39–83 || L5
|-style=background:#fbb
||123|| August 17 || @ Red Sox || 0–4 || Rodríguez (11–9) || Wojciechowski (2–6) || — || 36,744 || 39–84 || L6
|-style=background:#fbb
||124|| August 18 || @ Red Sox || 7–13 || Walden (8–2) || Fry (1–5) || — || 36,350 || 39–85 || L7
|-style=background:#fbb
||125|| August 19 || Royals || 4–5 || López (2–7) || Means (8–9) || Kennedy (22) || 11,659 || 39–86 || L8
|-style=background:#bfb
||126|| August 20 || Royals || 4–1 || Harvey (1–0) || Barnes (1–2) || Givens (10) || 11,826 || 40–86 || W1
|-style=background:#bfb
||127|| August 21 || Royals || 8–1 || Brooks (3–7) || Montgomery (3–6) || — || 9,872 || 41–86 || W2
|-style=background:#fbb
||128|| August 22 || Rays || 2–5 || Drake (2–1) || Castro (1–2) || Pagán (14) || 8,153 || 41–87 || L1
|-style="text-align:center; background-color:#933; color:white
||129|| August 23 || Rays || 1–7 || Richards (4–12) || Blach (0–2) || Slegers (1) || 14,762 || 41–88 || L2
|-style=background:#bfb
||130|| August 24 || Rays || 7–1 || Means (9–9) || Alvarado (1–6) || — || 11,409 || 42–88 || W1
|-style=background:#bfb
||131|| August 25 || Rays || 8–3 || Bundy (6–13) || Castillo (2–7) || — || 13,287 || 43–88 || W2
|-style=background:#bfb
||132|| August 27 || @ Nationals || 2–0 || Brooks (4–7) || Corbin (10–6) || Givens (11) || 24,946 || 44–88 || W3
|-style=background:#fbb
||133|| August 28 || @ Nationals || 4–8 || Suero (5–7) || Wojciechowski (2–7) || — || 25,174 || 44–89 || L1
|-style=background:#bfb
||134|| August 30 || @ Royals || 14–2 || Means (10–9) || Skoglund (0–1) || — || 16,287 || 45–89 || W1
|-style=background:#fbb
||135|| August 31 || @ Royals || 5–7 || Barlow (3–3) || Fry (1–6) || Kennedy (24) || 18,385 || 45–90 || L1
|-

|-style=background:#fbb
||136|| September 1 || @ Royals || 4–6 || McCarthy (3–2) || Fry (1–7) || Kennedy (25) || 18,208 || 45–91 || L2
|-style=background:#fbb
||137|| September 2 || @ Rays || 4–5  || Poche (4–4) || Tate (0–1) || — || 10,566 || 45–92 || L3
|-style=background:#bfb
||138|| September 3 || @ Rays || 4–2 || Blach (1–2) || Drake (3–2) || Bleier (3) || N/A || 46–92 || W1
|-style=background:#fbb
||139|| September 3 || @ Rays || 0–2 || Castillo (3–8) || Ynoa (1–8) || Pagán (17) || 6,844 || 46–93 || L1
|-style=background:#fbb
||140|| September 5 || Rangers || 1–3 || Allard (4–0) || Means (10–10) || Leclerc (10) || 8,209 || 46–94 || L2
|-style=background:#fbb
||141|| September 6 || Rangers || 6–7 || Martin (2–3) || Fry (1–8) || Leclerc (11) || 10,596 || 46–95 || L3
|-style=background:#fbb
||142|| September 7 || Rangers || 4–9 || Méndez (1–0) || Brooks (4–8) || — || 11,796 || 46–96 || L4
|-style=background:#fbb
||143|| September 8 || Rangers || 4–10 || Minor (13–8) || Wojciechowski (2–8) || — || 16,142 || 46–97 || L5
|-style=background:#fbb
||144|| September 10 || Dodgers || 3–7 || Buehler (13–3) || Blach (1–3) || — || 12,356 || 46–98 || L6
|-style=background:#bfb
||145|| September 11 || Dodgers || 7–3 || Armstrong (1–1) || Ferguson (1–2) || — || 11,438 || 47–98 || W1
|-style=background:#fbb
||146|| September 12 || Dodgers || 2–4 || Gonsolin (3–2) || Bundy (6–14) || Jansen (29) || 12,746 || 47–99 || L1
|-style=background:#bfb
||147|| September 13 || @ Tigers || 6–2 || Brooks (5–8) || Zimmermann (1–11) || — || 14,722 || 48–99 || W1
|-style=background:#fbb
||148|| September 14 || @ Tigers || 4–8  || Schreiber (2–0) || Fry (1–9) || — || 17,760 || 48–100 || L1
|-style=background:#bfb
||149|| September 15 || @ Tigers || 8–2 || Wojciechowski (3–8) || Jackson (3–10) || — || 15,688 || 49–100 || W1
|-style=background:#fbb
||150|| September 16 || @ Tigers || 2–5 || Alexander (1–3) || Means (10–11) || Jiménez (7) || 14,142 || 49–101 || L1
|-style=background:#fbb
||151|| September 17 || Blue Jays || 5–8 || Law (1–2) || Givens (2–6) || — || 9,280 || 49–102 || L2
|-style=background:#fbb
||152|| September 18 || Blue Jays || 10–11 || Stewart (4–0) || Castro (1–3) || Law (5) || 9,066 || 49–103 || L3
|-style=background:#fbb
||153|| September 19 || Blue Jays || 4–8 || Kay (1–0) || Ynoa (1–9) || — || 10,148 || 49–104 || L4
|-style=background:#bfb
||154|| September 20 || Mariners || 5–3 || Brooks (6–8) || Hernández (1–7) || — || 11,714 || 50–104 || W1
|-style=background:#fbb
||155|| September 21 || Mariners || 6–7  || Altavilla (2–1) || Scott (1–1) || Swanson (2) || 22,556 || 50–105 || L1
|-style=background:#bfb
||156|| September 22 || Mariners || 2–1 || Means (11–11) || Gonzales (16–10) || Bleier (4) || 17,540 || 51–105 || W1
|-style=background:#fbb
||157|| September 23 || @ Blue Jays || 10–11  || Adam (3–0) || Eades (0–1) || — || 13,193 || 51–106 || L1
|-style=background:#bfb
||158|| September 24 || @ Blue Jays || 11–4 || Bundy (7–14) || Pannone (3–6) || — || 12,625 || 52–106 || W1
|-style=background:#fbb
||159|| September 25 || @ Blue Jays || 2–3 || Waguespack (5–5) || Ynoa (1–10) || Giles (22) || 13,853 || 52–107 || L1
|-style=background:#bfb
||160|| September 27 || @ Red Sox || 4–1 || Wojciechowski (4–8) || Eovaldi (2–1) || — || 34,533 || 53–107 || W1
|-style=background:#bfb
||161|| September 28 || @ Red Sox || 9–4 || Means (12–11) || Chacín (3–12) || — || 36,414 || 54–107 || W2
|-style=background:#fbb
||162|| September 29 || @ Red Sox || 4–5 || Workman (10–1) || Tate (0–2) || — || 35,427 || 54–108 || L1
|-

|- style="text-align:center;"
| Legend:       = Win       = Loss       = PostponementBold = Orioles team member

Roster

Farm System

References

External links
2019 Baltimore Orioles season at official site
2019 Baltimore Orioles season at Baseball Reference

Baltimore Orioles seasons
Baltimore Orioles
Baltimore Orioles